{{Infobox person
| name               = Khwaja Ghulam Saiyidain
| birth_date         = 1904
| birth_place        = Panipat, Punjab Province (British India)
| death_date         =  Aligarh
| occupation         = EducationistWriter
| known for          = Educational reformsWritings
| children           = Syeda Saiyidain HameedZakia Zaheer
| awards             = Padma BhushanSahitya Akademi Award
}}
Khwaja Ghulam Saiyidain (1904–1971) was an Indian educationist, writer and the Secretary at the Ministry of Education of the Government of India, known for his contributions to Indian educational sector. Born in 1904 in the historic city of Panipat, in the Indian state of Haryana, Saiyidain authored several publications on Indian culture and education including a 1960 report which is reported to have served as the blueprint for the establishment of National Service Scheme, a youth-centric social programme sponsored by the Union Government. He wrote in Urdu and English languages and his book, Andhi Mein Chirag, won the Sahitya Akademi Award in 1963. Iqbal's Educational Philosophy, The Crisis in Modern Society, Education, Culture and the Social Order and The School of the Future are some of his other notable works. The Government of India awarded him the third highest civilian honour of the Padma Bhushan, in 1967, for his contributions to Indian education sector.

He was the father of Syeda Saiyidain Hameed and Zakia Zaheer.

See also 
 National Service Scheme

References 

Recipients of the Padma Bhushan in literature & education
1904 births
1971 deaths
People from Panipat district
Scholars from Haryana
20th-century Indian educational theorists
Indian male writers
Urdu-language writers from India
Recipients of the Sahitya Akademi Award in Urdu
20th-century Indian non-fiction writers